Lalan may refer to:

 Lalan, Indonesia, a district in the Musi Banyuasin Regency, South Sumatra Province, Sumatra, Indonesia
 Lalan-e Olya, East
 Lalan-e Sofla, East Azerbaijan
 Lalan, Isfahan
 Lalan, Markazi
 Lalan, Tehran
Lalan (artist) , Xie Jinglan

See also
 Lalon, the great Bengali Baul saint